Deeba Salim (Deeba Salim Irfan, born 5 September 1969) is an Indian writer, an award-winning poet and a brand expert. She has called Dubai home for over two decades.

Early life

Irfan was born in Aligarh. She is the eldest of the three daughters. Her father, Dr. Syed Salim Hamid was an ENT surgeon and mother, Mohsena Salim is a beauty expert. Her parents moved to Iran while she was in primary school. She went to school in Kerman, but returned to India when the English schools closed down after the Iranian revolution.

Career 
She began writing in childhood, ever since she had to leave her parents who were in Iran, to live with her grand parents back in India. This partition from her parents was a gift of the Iranian revolution. Emotions vented through words shaped poems and prose that she kept hidden until much later.

She returned a shy girl and studied for three years at Our Lady of Fatima in Aligarh and then completed schooling from Summer Fields School, New Delhi, India. After that she went to Aligarh Muslim University (AMU) to study economics. After graduation she returned to Delhi and studied programming. She worked as a programmer, but was not satisfied. She returned to AMU, to pursue an MBA in Marketing.

She attended courses in novel writing from London School of Journalism and University of Oxford.

She married businessman and filmmaker Irfan Izhar in 1998 and moved to Dubai. The couple has three children.

Marketing
Irfan was involved in marketing strategy roles for over two decades. She worked in advertising and events with agencies including Percept in New Delhi, India and Communiqué, heading them for the Middle East.

Works

URMA 
Her debut novel, URMA, was published in India, translated into Urdu and nominated for an award .The story follows an Iranian woman transplanted to Europe by the Iranian revolution in 1979. Searching for a way back to the Iran of her youth, best-selling author Urma walks through adult life incomplete. She isolates herself in Athens, Greece, wallowing in her memories of betrayals perpetrated by the men she has known. Connecting with school chums from Iran only serves to remind her of what she does not have. When the love of her life returns after a twenty-five year absence, Urma must search inside to find the kernel of home she has carried all along and open herself to accept what is rather than what was.

355 Days 
Her second novel is inspired by true events.355 Days. It covers 355 days in the life of a British- Indian tycoon, Aadesh Dixit; his wife, Maya and his lawyer, Nasha Singh.

Charcoal  Blush 
Her poetry coffee table book, Charcoal Blush’ was the finalist at the 2017 Book Excellence Awards in Canada. It was launched at AMU Literary Festival in India, in 2016 by Padma ShriKekiDaruwala, a well-known poet. Some of its poems have been translated into Nepalese and published in their leading literary magazine MadhuParkh. Charcoal Blush received praise from leading people including Academy Award-winning and Emmy Award-winning directors.

Awards
Irfan was recognized by the Government of Dubai as a writer and awarded her the first Cultural visa in the world, the Golden Visa. 

She received the ‘Outstanding Aligarian Award’ when her first novel was released in 2012.

Delhi Urdu Press Club recognized her for her efforts to enrich Urdu. This was presented by Bollywood scriptwriter and lyricist - Javed Akhtar in 2017.

In 2019, she received  ‘Global Star of the Year’ award at the AMU Women of Influence Conclave.

Initiative for nurturing writers
She has been on various global literary conference and jury sessions including iWrite’19 a competition for aspiring writers at Jaipur Book Mark, (Jaipur Literature Festival) and Abu Dhabi Book Fair. She was the chairperson of the advisory board of the Young Author Awards for traditionally published authors under the age of 30.

Ifran is the Founder of TheWriteScene.com - information and inspirational portal for aspiring writers.

She is the curator of writers' retreats in Dubai, Slovenia and in Kangra Valley, Himalayas with industry's best Editors as her guests. She believes in writing as a tool for healing and is looking to expand her retreats to Wellness Retreats and focus on ‘healing’ through writing.

She hosts a Meetup Group - TheWriteScene in Dubai,  to assist fellow writers with their work.

References

Further reading
 Faheem, Syyada. 2015. "A Feminist Study of Deeba Salim Irfan's Novel Urma". Research Journal of English Language and Literature, 3(4). 393–397. Available: http://www.rjelal.com/3.4.15/393-397%20SYYADA%20FAHEEM.pdf

1969 births
20th-century Emirati poets
Living people
People from Aligarh
Aligarh Muslim University alumni
21st-century Emirati poets
Emirati women poets